The 2010–11 UC Santa Barbara Gauchos men's basketball team represented the University of California, Santa Barbara during the 2010–11 college basketball season. This is head coach Bob Williams' thirteenth season at UCSB. The Gauchos compete in the Big West Conference and played their home games at the UC Santa Barbara Events Center, also known as The Thunderdome. 
They finished the season 18–14, 8–8 in Big West play to win the 2011 Big West Conference men's basketball tournament to earn the conference's automatic bid to the 2011 NCAA Division I men's basketball tournament where they earned a 15 seed in the Southeast Region and were defeated in the second round by 2 seed and AP #15 Florida.

Roster
Source

Schedule and results

|-
!colspan=9 style=|Exhibition

|-
!colspan=9 style=| Regular season

|-
!colspan=9 style=|Big West tournament

|-
!colspan=9 style=|NCAA tournament

References

Uc Santa Barbara
Uc Santa Barbara
UC Santa Barbara Gauchos men's basketball seasons